

Review and events

Pre–2015

Matches

Legend

Friendlies

Indonesia Super League

Statistics

Squad 
.

|}

Clean sheets 
As of 5 April 2015.

Disciplinary record 
As of 5 April 2015.

Transfers

In

Out

References

Sources 

PS Barito Putera